Eagle Records is a British record label, a division of Eagle Rock Entertainment, itself a subsidiary of Universal Music Group.

In the United Kingdom, the label's managing director is Lindsay Brown, former manager of Van Halen, while in the United States the head is Mike Carden, formerly of CMC International Records.

Artists 

Gary Moore
Asia
Deep Purple
Willy DeVille
Emerson, Lake & Palmer
Heart [in the UK]
John Lee Hooker
John Mayall
Jethro Tull
Magpie Salute
Michael Nesmith
Nazareth
Ted Nugent
Toto
Thunder
Hank Van Sickle
PMC
Yes
Hard Rain
The Rolling Stones
Queen
The Who
Peter Forbes
slash

Former artists 

Alice Cooper
Candy Dulfer
The Fall
Gary Glitter
Jeff Healey
Nik Kershaw
The Levellers
Robert Palmer
Pingy
The Pretenders
Simple Minds
Styx
Status Quo
Uriah Heep
Barry White
Gary Numan
Roland Orzabal
Vixen

References

External links 
 Official site

Labels distributed by Universal Music Group
Rock record labels